The Yale Interdisciplinary Center for Bioethics, or YICB, is an academic research center based primarily in the study of biomedical ethics.

It is partnered with the Hastings Center to sponsor the international Summer Bioethics Institute (SBI), and is a subsidiary of the Institution for Social and Policy Studies (ISPS).

Director Stephen Latham was contacted by a Croatian neuroscience team led by Dr. Nenad Sestan that had restored circulation and cellular function in a pig's brain ex vivo. The YICB ultimately agreed that there was no legal precedent against Sestan's team, but that it was in an ethical gray area. Latham further remarked that guidelines regarding such practices must be established before more, similar experiments are carried out.

References 

Bioethics research organizations